2-Nitrochlorobenzene is an organic compound with the formula ClC6H4NO2.  It is one of three isomeric nitrochlorobenzenes.  It is a yellow crystalline solid that is important as a precursor to other compounds due to its two functional groups.

Synthesis
Nitrochlorobenzene is typically synthesized by nitration of chlorobenzene in the presence of sulfuric acid:
C6H5Cl + HNO3 → O2NC6H4Cl + H2O

This reaction affords a mixture of isomers. Using an acid ratio of 30% nitric acid, 56% sulfuric acid and 14% water, the product mix is typically 34-36% 2-nitrochlorobenzene and 63-65% 4-nitrochlorobenzene, with only about 1% 3-nitrochlorobenzene.

Reactions
Alkylation and electrophilic aromatic substitution can occur at the chlorinated carbon center, and a diverse array of reactions can be carried out using the nitro group.  2-Nitrochlorobenzene can be reduced to the 2-chloroaniline with Fe/HCl mixture, the Bechamp reduction.  Treatment of 2-nitrochlorobenzene with sodium methoxide gives 2-nitroanisole.

Applications
2-Nitrochlorobenzene is not valuable in itself but is a precursor to other useful compounds. The compound is particularly useful because both of its reactive sites can be utilized to create further compounds that are mutually ortho. Its derivative 2-chloroaniline is a precursor to 3,3’-dichlorobenzidine, itself a precursor to many dyes and pesticides.

References

Nitrobenzenes
Chloroarenes